William James Early Bennett (1804 – 1886) was an Anglican priest. Bennett is celebrated for having provoked the decision that the doctrine of the Real Presence is a dogma not inconsistent with the creed of the Church of England. This followed the publication of his pamphlet A Plea for Toleration in the Church of England (1867) in the form of a letter to Edward Bouverie Pusey.

Life
Bennett was born at Halifax, Nova Scotia, on 15 November 1804, the eldest of three sons of Major William Bennett, RE, and Mary Early, daughter of James Early, an officer of the 1st Royal Garrison Battalion. His younger brother, George Augustus Bennett (1807–1845), like their father, served in the Corps of Royal Engineers. His youngest brother, Frederick Hamilton Bennett (1816–73), ordained to the curacy of Daventry (1840), Curate-in-charge of St John's, Worcester (1842–1851), Master of Arts, Christ Church, Oxford (1843), served his final appointment as the first vicar of Saint Mary the Virgin, Freeland, Oxfordshire, from 1869.

Bennett was educated at Westminster School and Christ Church, Oxford (BA, 1827, MA, 1829). He married Mary Concetta Franklin in 1828, prior to being ordained a priest by the Bishop of London on 6 June 1830. He initially served in 1830 as curate of Oxford Chapel (later called St. Peter's, Vere Street, London), but he soon moved to curacies at Holy Trinity Church Marylebone (1830–1833), followed by All Souls Church, Langham Place (1833–1838). For a while he held this latter post alongside the Perpetual curacy of Portman Chapel, Portman Square 1836–1841). His post was subsequently redesignated as Perpetual curate of St Paul's Church, Knightsbridge and St Barnabas, Pimlico.  He supervised the completion of the former church and was effectively the founder of the latter.  At the same time he conceived the idea of establishing a college there to accommodate the priests and its choristers. In 1851 he felt obliged to resign these posts following doctrinal complaints and a theological dispute with his bishop, Charles James Blomfield - after being accused of ritualism.  Finally in 1852 he was appointed as Vicar of the Church of St John the Baptist, Frome or Frome-Selwood in Somerset, where he remained until his death on 17 August 1886.

A prolific writer, his numerous works were listed in successive editions of Crockford's Clerical Directory. His publication The Old Church Porch (1854–1862), issued at Frome, is sometimes cited as being in effect the first parish magazine, although this claim has been disputed.

A more detailed account of his life and of his contribution to the Oxford Movement was provided by his nephew Frederick Bennett (Frederick Hamilton Bennett's son) formerly Rector of Farleigh, Surrey.

Crest of Bennett
Crest—Out of a mural crown or, a lion's head gules. Motto—De bon vouloir servir le roy (To serve the king with good will).

References

External links
Works by W.J.E. Bennett from Project Canterbury

19th-century English Anglican priests
English sermon writers
1804 births
1886 deaths